Joseph Agostini (1872 – 1945) was a Trinidadian cricketer. He played in seven first-class matches for Trinidad and Tobago from 1891 to 1897.

See also
 List of Trinidadian representative cricketers

References

External links
 

1872 births
1945 deaths
Trinidad and Tobago cricketers